The Master of the Perkins Saint Paul was an Italian artist active during the third quarter of the fourteenth century.  His origins are uncertain; he is believed to have been Tuscan, and has tentatively been linked by some historians with the city of Lucca.  He appears to have been familiar with the work of Antonio Veneziano.  A number of his works, including that from which his name is derived, are held by the Treasury of the Basilica of San Francesco d'Assisi.

References
Morello, Giovanni and Laurence B. Kanter, ed.: The Treasury of Saint Francis of Assisi.  Milan; Electa, 1999.

14th-century Italian painters
Perkins Saint Paul, Master of the